U-20 may refer to one of the following German submarines:

 , was a Type U 19 submarine launched in 1912 and that served in the First World War until grounded on 4 November 1916; notable for sinking 
 During the First World War, Germany also had these submarines with similar names:
 , a Type UB II submarine launched in 1915 and sunk 28 July 1917
 , a Type UC II submarine launched in 1916 and surrendered on 16 January 1919
 , a Type IIB submarine that served in the Second World War and was scuttled on 10 September 1944
 , a Type 206 submarine of the Bundesmarine that was launched in 1974 and scrapped in 1996 and sold to Indonesia

U-20 or U-XX may also refer to:
 , lead boat of the  submarines for the Austro-Hungarian Navy

Submarines of Germany